Rise of the Guardians: Music From The Motion Picture is the score album to the 2012 of the same name, composed by Alexandre Desplat. The film marked Desplat's maiden score for a computer-animated film as well as his DreamWorks' film, not to be scored by either Hans Zimmer or his Remote Control Productions family of composers. The score was recorded at Abbey Road Studios and AIR Studios in London and features collaborations with London Symphony Orchestra (conducted by Desplat) and London Voices performing. In addition to Desplat's score, an original song "Still Dream" written by David Lindsay-Abaire and performed by soprano singer Renée Fleming, was featured in the film's end credits. Both Desplat's score and Fleming's original song was included in the film's score album, released by Varèse Sarabande on November 13, 2012 and received positive response praising Desplat's compositions.

Development 

Ramsey admired Desplat's work since Birth (2004), and wanted to work with him in his film. Desplat was then suggested by the creative head of DreamWorks Animation, Bill Damaschke after being considered for several of the projects. The music of Rise of the Guardians is "actually rather complex", where "there are clear lines you can follow, and melodies you can hum along to, but the orchestration is rather sophisticated". He referenced Mysterious Island (1961) as an example in which "the music was accessible but extremely demanding", and John Williams scores for Star Wars and Indiana Jones franchises were "sophisticated, complex, dissonant", but watched by all age groups.

Desplat called that "there is so much in this film, so many influences, and so much beauty in the way the camera moves. It's really a mix of many things", adding that the film influences from fine art, video art, literature and music. He praised Ramsey's vision, recalling that he brought a book for Gerhard Richter for referencing the film, when Desplat was set to begin film's music. Though the characters were incorporated from folklore and fairy tales, he did not influence from folk music in the period, but created new music for the characters. For Alec Baldwin, who plays Nicholas St. North (Santa Claus), Desplat felt that his vocals were one of the strong aspects for the film, which resulted him using a Russian instrument while riding a sleigh, hence he became a "Russian Santa Claus". Igor Stravinsky's "Firebird Suite" was integrated whenever North appears in the film.

While recording the film's music, Ramsey used to whistle few themes while scoring the album, as "he grew up in a household with a lot of music" and added that Desplat asked him to play an instrument, which he agreed. He then played guitar for some of the scores, which he felt as a "huge compliment and really interesting", adding that "when I’m scoring a film, I can always tell if the director likes and understands music, because of the scenes themselves and the way they’re edited. The flow and the pacing makes it easier for me to score, if the film has a musical feel to it.  I just though that was interesting: there is an organic kind of feel to it that I guess a lot of comes from music."

The score was recorded in London at the AIR Studios and Abbey Road Studios, within three months beginning from June to September 2012, when the film was under post-production. The London Symphony Orchestra and London Voices performed the orchestra and choir, respectively for the film's score, with Desplat conducting. In addition to Desplat's score, an original song "Still Dream" written by David Lindsay-Abaire and performed by soprano Renée Fleming was featured in the film's end credits.

Reception 
James Southall of Movie Wave wrote "Desplat had worked in the fantasy genre before this score, of course – The Golden Compass (2007) was a wonderful piece of work, full of the rich depths of the wonderful source novel in a way that the film itself sadly wasn’t, and it’s a great shame that the composer never got the chance to complete that trilogy he had clearly planned out so carefully. Rise of the Guardians is a much lighter work than that but still a satisfying one – it has a terrific collection of themes – and it confirms the composer’s credentials in this genre." Filmtracks.com wrote "Had the various phrases of "Still Dream" been condensed into an easier form and better integrated with the great potential of Jack's theme, Rise of the Guardians could have been a five-star score. But the elusiveness of these themes and that of Pitch, as well as the countering transparency of the overly-heroic Guardians identity and a very, very dry mix, leave a slight sense of dissatisfaction with the whole. One thing is certain, though: you can't question Desplat's chops in the children's genre from here forward."

The Joy of Movies wrote "Desplat’s score has a childlike sense of wonder and innocence throughout. It has quite a gentle sound at times with many quick, light notes, which contrast with the occasional darker sounds of Pitch, and the quieter emotional tracks for Jack’s backstory. In some ways, for better or for worse, it is a very classic sounding score for an animated film." James Christopher Monger of Allmusic wrote "the soundtrack for Dreamworks Animation's Rise of the Guardians is as spirited and surprising as it is refreshingly old-fashioned. Desplat must have tucked away some extra magic after completing the scores for the final two Harry Potter films, because his work here is steeped in Hogwarts-inspired whimsy." Reviewing the song "Still Dream", Monger called it as "a sweet and sentimental ballad performed by soprano Renée Fleming, sets the tone, suggesting a classic old-world Disney approach to the fable, but Desplat never lets things dissolve into treacle, providing a muscular main theme that, along with the main melody from "Still Dream" weaves itself throughout the film with a quaint yet confident majesty."

Track listing

Charts

Accolades

Personnel 
Credits adapted from CD liner notes.

 Production
 Music producer – Alexandre Desplat
 Programming – Romain Allender, Xavier Forcioli
 Recording – Jonathan Allen, Richard King, Andrew Dudman
 Editing – Joe E. Rand, Barbara McDermott
 Mixing – Andrew Dudman, Joel Iwataki
 Mastering – Patricia Sullivan
 Technical
 Music co-ordinator – Roger Tang
 Copyist – Mark Graham
 Score engineer – Alex Firla
 Assistant engineer – Paul Pritchard, Fiona Cruickshank, Jack Sugden, John Prestage, Matt Jones, Paul Pritchard
 Soundtrack executive producer – Robert Townson
 Studio manager – Alison Burton, Colette Barber
 London Symphony Orchestra
 Conductor – Alexandre Desplat
 Orchestration – Alexandre Desplat, Conrad Pope
 Additional orchestration – Bill Newlin, Clifford J. Tasner, Nan Schwartz
 Orchestra leader – Carmine Lauri
 Contractor – Marc Stevens, Sue Mallet
 Technician – Chris Cozens
 London Voices
 Conductor – Terry Edwards
 Instruments
 Cimbalom – Lurie Morar
 Guitar – Huw Davies
 Percussion – Paul Clarvis
 Piano – Dave Arch
 Management
 Music clearance – Julie Butchko
 Music business affairs – Dan Butler, Jennifer Schiller, Liz McNicoll
 Executive in charge of music – Sunny Park
 Music consultant – Charlene Ann Huang
 Marketing – Susan Thampi

Notes

References 

2012 soundtrack albums
Varèse Sarabande soundtracks
Alexandre Desplat soundtracks